No Pain, No Gain is a 2005 American comedy-drama film starring Gus Malliarodakis, Joe Hursley, Julie Strain, Harry Knowles, Lauren Powers, Toni Ferrai, co-written by Samuel Turcotte and Jodi Lane Baum and directed by Samuel Turcotte.

Plot
The story of a bodybuilder who longs to be respected for his mind. Mike Zorillo, a small town Ohio champion bodybuilder with a genius IQ, journeys to the Mecca of bodybuilding, Los Angeles, determined to beat his nemesis, Jake Steel, with natural science instead of steroids. Far from home, he's confronted by a gym culture of freaks, juicers and Hollywood wannabes. As he pursues his dream, he's also persecuted by the world's largest sports nutrition company, an entity that's hell-bent on destroying him. Against all odds, the honest and driven bodybuilder resolves to win the prestigious "Mr. West Coast" competition as a way to prove himself and his ideas to the world.

References

External links
 

2005 films
American independent films
American sports comedy-drama films
2005 independent films
Bodybuilding films
2000s sports comedy-drama films
2005 comedy films
2005 drama films
2000s English-language films
2000s American films